Shahkot Proper is an administrative unit, known as Union council, of Malakand District in the Khyber Pakhtunkhwa province of Pakistan. The name of Sakhakot is derived from two words, "Sakha" and "Kot" which means "fort of generosity". People of Sakhakot are historically best known for their hospitality and generosity. The area is termed as a fort because of its providing shelter to those who sought asylum during enmity. One of the elder Shahi Baba of Yousafzai tribe proclaimed that nobody dare touch the people who are once given protection. Shahi Baba of Shalman Rais Branch was also known for his guerilla war against British invaders. He gave a tough time to the British invaders by joining hands with Sartor Faqir who was later on martyred. This was a setback and the British strengthened their camp in Kharki village.

At present it is famous for handmade weapons industry.

Malakand district has 2 Tehsils i.e. Swat Ranizai and Sam Ranizai. Each Tehsil comprises certain numbers of Union councils. There are 28 union councils in Malakand district.

See also 

Malakand District

External links
Khyber-Pakhtunkhwa Government website section on Lower Dir
United Nations
Hajjinfo.org Uploads
PBS paiman.jsi.com

Malakand District
Populated places in Malakand District
Union councils of Khyber Pakhtunkhwa
Union Councils of Malakand District